Heathsville is an unincorporated community in Halifax County, North Carolina, United States. It is part of the Roanoke Rapids, North Carolina Micropolitan Statistical Area.

The community is located along North Carolina Highway 561.

References

Unincorporated communities in North Carolina
Unincorporated communities in Halifax County, North Carolina
Roanoke Rapids, North Carolina micropolitan area